Melksham is a town and civil parish on the River Avon in Wiltshire, England, about  northeast of Trowbridge and  south of Chippenham. At the 2011 census, the Melksham built-up area had a population of 19,357, making it Wiltshire's fifth-largest settlement after Swindon, Salisbury, Chippenham and Trowbridge.

History

Early history 
Excavations in 2021 in the grounds of Melksham House found fragments of locally made pottery from the early Iron Age (7th to 4th centuries BC). There is evidence of settlement continuing into the later Iron Age and Roman periods, including Roman clay roof tiles.

Melksham developed at a ford across the River Avon. The name is presumed to derive from "meolc", the Old English for milk, and "ham", a village. On John Speed's map of Wiltshire (1611), the name is spelt both Melkesam (for the hundred) and Milsham (for the town itself).

Melksham is also the name of the Royal forest that occupied the surrounding of the area in the Middle Ages.

Landowners 
In 1539 the prioress and nuns of Amesbury surrendered to the king their Melksham estates, which they had held for some 250 years. This property, which consisted of the lordship of the manor and hundred, was in 1541 granted to Sir Thomas Seymour. He then sold it to Henry Brouncker, who also had lands nearby at Erlestoke. At some uncertain date, perhaps about 1550, Brouncker built a residence for himself near Melksham church on the site of an earlier mansion. This was known as Place House.

Three generations of the family lived here: Henry Brouncker the founder, (d.1569), his son, Sir William, and his grandson Henry. On the death of this last Henry, about 1600, it became manifest that the Brouncker estate was heavily encumbered, and in the course of the next twenty or thirty years, all the property was alienated with the exception of Erlestoke, where William Brouncker, the heir, retired with his wife Anne, daughter of Sir John Dauntesey. Meanwhile, Place House was occupied for ten or eleven years by Henry Brouncker's widow and her second husband, Ambrose Dauntesey. After their death, in 1612, the house apparently was occupied by the steward, and afterwards it was conveyed to Sir John Danvers, who married into the family, in 1634. Danvers died in 1655 and the lordship of Melksham passed to his son, who then conveyed the estate to Walter Long the Younger, of Whaddon. The lordship remained in the Long family, who were descended from the first Henry Brouncker, until the early part of the 20th century, having passed to the 1st Viscount Long of Wraxall.

Melksham Bank
An announcement was made in the Bath Chronicle in June 1792 of the establishment of the Melksham Bank by the firm of Awdry, Long & Bruges. In November 1813 the misquoting of part of an advertisement in two London newspapers caused panic amongst the bank customers, many of whom quickly withdrew their money, reportedly causing "some bustle" among the partners of the bank. There was further trouble in 1812, when the bank was listed on a Parliamentary Paper of the House of Commons under the title "Country Banks Becoming Bankrupt".

Moule's bank became the North Wilts Banking Company in 1835, which merged in 1877 to form Capital and Counties Bank. The latter developed a nationwide branch network and was taken over by Lloyds Bank in 1918.

Masonic Lodge
The Chaloner Lodge of Freemasons (no.2644) was named after its first Worshipful Master Richard Godolphin Walmesley Chaloner, 1st Baron Gisborough, who, when not in London, resided at Melksham House. He was the brother of the 1st Viscount Long. The lodge was consecrated on 27 February 1897, with the first meeting scheduled for 4 pm 19 March, held at the town hall. Writing from London while attending his Parliamentary duties as MP for Westbury, he complained that this date was inconvenient due to his having to be at Melton Mowbray to ride in the House of Commons point to point steeplechase the next day. Despite this, the meeting went ahead and Chaloner initiated 13 of the candidates, returning to London overnight by train, getting virtually no sleep before his ride in the steeplechase early the next morning, resulting in him twice falling heavily from his horse. Later while deciding what extra furniture the lodge required, he asked that he have a special footstool, as his chair was high and his feet "dangled unpleasantly".

The Spa

In 1815 the Melksham Spa Company was formed by a group of 'respectable gentlemen', with names such as Methuen, Long and others, all of whom had done very well from the now declining textile industry. Their aim was to promote a spa, after abortive attempts to find coal had uncovered two springs. As a consequence they built six large three-storeyed, semi-detached lodging houses forming a crescent, a pump room and hot and cold private baths. This suburban area at the southern end of the town is now known as The Spa, belonging to the civil parish of Melksham Without. A plan for a similar crescent on the north side never materialised. Simultaneously an Act was obtained to 'improve the pleasing town of Melksham' by paving and improving its footways and cleansing, lighting and watching the streets. The spa was not as successful as had been hoped, due in part to the popularity of the waters at nearby Bath.

Buildings and structures 
There are two Grade II* listed structures in the parish: St Michael's Church and one of the chest tombs in its churchyard.

Pevsner wrote that "the only rewarding part of Melksham is by the church". Melksham House, south of the church, is early 18th century but largely rebuilt after a 1920 fire and adapted for use as a sports and social club. Southwest of the church, a 15th-century tithe barn was remodelled into a school by G. E. Street in 1878; the school left the premises in 1973 and the building is now residential.

The area around Canon Square, north of the church, has several Grade II listed houses and cottages, among them a former vicarage dating from the late 17th century, remodelled in 1877 by Street and now divided into two residences. There is also a small two-storey roundhouse, built in the late 18th century for the wool industry.

The town's four-span bridge over the Avon is from the late 18th century.

Religious sites 

A church was recorded at Melksham in Domesday Book, 1086. The parish church of St Michael and All Angels has 12th-century origins, and was enlarged in the 14th, 15th and 16th centuries; in 1845 it was restored by T. H. Wyatt and is now a Grade II* listed building. As the town expanded, in 1876 St Andrew's church was built in Early English style to serve the Forest area to the northeast of the town.

A Baptist chapel was erected at Old Broughton Road in 1714, and replaced with a larger building on the same site in 1776 which was enlarged in 1839. In 1850 there were 165 members, and 340 children attended the Sunday School. In 1909, school buildings were completed on land in front of the chapel.

Ebenezer Baptist Church, Union Street, was built in 1835 by Particular Baptists. A Methodist chapel was built on the High Street in 1872, its two-storey front having four large Corinthian columns and a cornice with oculus. This became the United Church after the union of the Methodists and Congregationalists in 1976, and the Congregational church off the Market Place closed.

A Catholic church, St Anthony of Padua, was built in pale brick to the south of the town centre and opened in 1939. An independent congregation built Queensway Chapel in the eastern suburbs in 1967.

Melksham has a long history of Quakerism, beginning with meetings nearby at Shaw in the 17th century. A meeting-house was built in 1698 at what is now King Street, and rebuilt on the same site around 1777 (or 1734). Quakerism declined in the 19th century but the Melksham meeting continued until 1950. The meeting-house was sold in 1958 and was used as a Spiritualist church for a time; in 2015 the building was restored and converted into offices.

Governance

Until 1974 the town was managed by Melksham Urban District Council, based at Melksham Town Hall. It was then managed by West Wiltshire District Council, but since the abolition of West Wiltshire in 2009, the most significant local government functions (including schools, roads, social services, recycling, emergency planning, leisure services, housing, development control and waste disposal) have been carried out by Wiltshire Council, a unitary authority.

Melksham civil parish has a town council, with fifteen members elected by four wards: East, Forest, North and South. The councillors elect one of their number as Mayor of Melksham for a one-year term. As well as having a consultative role, the town council runs the Assembly Hall events venue. Since 2019–2020 it is responsible for the town's play areas and King George V playing field, after transfer of ownership from Wiltshire Council.

The outskirts of Melksham, and most of the surrounding rural communities, are administered by another parish council, Melksham Without.

Melksham is in the Chippenham parliamentary constituency, which since 2015 has been represented in the House of Commons by Michelle Donelan, a Conservative.

Geography

The civil parish of Melksham includes Melksham Forest, formerly a separate settlement  to the northeast and now a suburb of the town.  It has an Anglican church (St Andrew's, 1876) and had a Methodist chapel (1905 to before 2010).

The parish of Melksham Without includes several villages and suburbs of Melksham:
Bowerhill, a large residential community generally considered as separate from Melksham, with a large industrial area
Hunter's Meadow, a 2020s development north of Bowerhill
Berryfield, a village south of and adjacent to Melksham, often considered part of the town
Beanacre, a village to the north, again often considered as a northern suburb of the town.

Demography 
In the 19th century, the population of Melksham parish increased from 4,000 at the 1801 census to 5,800 in 1851, then declined to 2,100 in 1891. Numbers increased slowly in the first half of the 20th century and more rapidly in the second half, rising to 14,204 by 2001. The 2011 census saw a modest increase to 14,677.

The wider built-up area – which includes Berryfield and Bowerhill, both in Melksham Without parish – had a population of 19,357 at the 2011 census.

Economy

The Shell Guide to Wiltshire, published in 1968, characterised the town as "with the exception of Swindon the most industrialized in the county". Today, Melksham has varied industries including Avon Rubber, which previously owned the Avon Tyre plant on a riverside site in the town centre. The plant is now the home of Cooper Tire & Rubber (a subsidiary of the American Goodyear company) and is still a major employer in the town, producing Cooper Avon and Avon Tyres brands.  In 2000, Avon Rubber plc moved to a large purpose-built facility  to the south of the town near Semington, employing over 300 on products such as gasmasks. Melksham is also home to Knorr-Bremse, a designer and manufacturer of railway braking systems, at a purpose-built facility in south Bowerhill.

The town has a thriving business district, is close to the retail centres of Bath, Chippenham, Devizes and Trowbridge, and is surrounded by attractive villages such as Lacock, Holt, Seend and Semington. To cater for the growth in recent years there are new schools and improved infrastructure, although small pockets of Melksham town centre, including a 1960 shopping parade, await redevelopment.

Melksham has a number of pharmacies, high street clothes shops, charity shops and privately run individual stores. It has five supermarkets: Asda, Sainsbury's, Waitrose, Lidl and Aldi.

Culture and community
Melksham has an Assembly Hall and the Rachel Fowler Centre, while many of the surrounding villages have community halls which offer a wide variety of activities. Melksham Oak Community School offers a variety of sporting and cultural facilities to the community of Melksham.

The town has an annual 'Party in the Park' which usually takes place in July. It includes a fair with rides and amusements, a fireworks display, a stage hosting musical and dance acts and a carnival parade through the town with floats promoting local businesses and clubs and raising money for charity.

Melksham Independent News is the town's family-owned independent newspaper, established in 1981. Over 13,700 copies of the paper are distributed across the town and surrounding villages biweekly.

Sport and leisure
Melksham has a non-League football club, Melksham Town F.C., who play at the Oakfield Stadium on Eastern Way, which opened in January 2017. In 2018 the club won promotion from the Western League to the Southern League. Melksham Rugby Union Club also play at the Oakfields complex, on separate pitches.

In the town there is a swimming pool and at Bowerhill is the Wiltshire School of Gymnastics. Melksham also has a cricket club who play their home matches at the Melksham House ground. The club has both youth and adult teams; in the 2019 season their Saturday side competes in Division 4 of the Wiltshire County Cricket League following promotion in 2018.

In November 2019, Wiltshire Council gave final planning permission for the much-delayed Community Campus on the grounds of Melksham House, which will provide a swimming pool, library, sports centre and council offices.

Transport

Melksham railway station, on the branch of the Wessex Main Line from Chippenham to Trowbridge, has services roughly every two hours in each direction on weekdays. Trains are operated by Great Western Railway, with services marketed as the 'TransWilts line' between Westbury and Swindon.

Melksham is served by bus companies including Faresaver and First West of England.

The town is on the north–south A350 primary route from the M4 motorway (Junction 17, near Chippenham) to Poole on the south coast. In February 2020, the central government gave approval for a £125m re-routing of the A350 to the east of Melksham.

Education
Primary schools within Melksham parish are:
Aloeric Primary School
Forest & Sandridge C of E Primary School
The Manor C of E VC Primary School (formerly Lowbourne Junior, St Michaels School)
River Mead School (formerly King's Park Primary School, Lowbourne Infants School)

Primary schools near the town include:

Bowerhill Primary School
Churchfields Primary School, Atworth
Seend C of E Primary School
Shaw C of E Primary School
St Mary's Broughton Gifford Primary School

There is one secondary school in the Melksham catchment area: Melksham Oak Community School opened in 2010 at Bowerhill, replacing The George Ward Technology College which served the community for over 50 years.

Stonar School, an all-ages independent day and boarding school, is nearby at Atworth.

Dinosaur
Melksham is the namesake for a prehistoric crocodile species discovered in the town. Ieldraan melkshamensis, or the Melksham Monster, was 10 ft long and was an apex predator in the waters around the UK during the Jurassic period. The fossil had been in the possession of the Natural History Museum since 1875, until a team from the University of Edinburgh led by Davide Foffa classified it in 2017 as a distinct species.

Notable people
Edward Barnwell (1813–1887), schoolmaster, archaeologist and antiquarian, owned Melksham House from 1866 and financed the building of St Andrew's church in the Forest area of the town
Matthew Bound, footballer
Edmund Wright Brooks (1834–1928), Quaker philanthropist
John Fowler (1826–1864), agricultural engineer
Ken Gill (1927–2009), trade union leader and caricaturist, born and brought up in Melksham
Sidney Goodwin (1910–1912), born in Melksham, child victim of the sinking of the Titanic together with his parents and five siblings
James Hurn, cricketer
Julia de Lacy Mann (1891–1985), economic historian, principal of St Hilda's College, Oxford; retired to Melksham, was president of the West Wilshire Historical Society
Robert Martineau, Anglican bishop; curate in Melksham from 1938
Phil McMullen, writer, music critic, events organiser
Henry Moule (1801–1880), pioneer of the earth closet
Horace Newte, writer, born in Melksham
Andy Park, known as "Mr. Christmas"
Diana Ross, children's author, lived at Shaw for many years
Brad Scott, MMA fighter 
John Dunlop Southern, cricketer
George Thicknesse, 19th Baron Audley, died, and is buried, in Melksham
Ann Yearsley (ca. 1753–1806), poet; died in Melksham

References

 
 British Spas from 1815 to the Present: A Social History, Phyllis M. Hembry, Leonard W. Cowie, Evelyn E. Cowie, Social Science, 1997
 Wiltshire Notes and Queries. Vol. IV 1903

External links

The Well House Collection – a privately run museum of Melksham

 
Towns in Wiltshire
Civil parishes in Wiltshire
English royal forests